Ernest David Weiss (7 December 1902 in Breslau – 19 January 1982) was a naturalised British Jewish concert pianist and transport economist who became a Soviet espionage agent, spying in the United Kingdom and possibly the United States. Weiss worked initially for the Communist International (Comintern) in the 1930's and later worked for the Red Orchestra espionage network through Comintern agent Henry Robinson  in the early 1940's. In 1947, Weiss's name was discovered through an analysis of the Robinson papers by MI5, his address was traced and Weiss and his associates were put under extensive surveillance by the security services. Weiss was arrested and interrogated at an MI5 safe house at 19 Rugby Mansions, Hammersmith on 30 January 1948. Weiss proved to be remarkably cooperative and in return for a confession, he was promised immunity by MI5. He was found to be a key individual in Soviet intelligence in the United Kingdom and named many other contacts that lead to further arrests. After his confession, he retired from espionage work and lived in London until is death in 1982.

Life
St. John's  was a school that accepted Jewish pupils without question. In 1922, Weiss matriculated at the University of Breslau to study the economics of transport. In 1927, Weiss was awarded a Diplom. Deciding to continue his education at Breslau in 1930, he was awarded a Doctor of Science in 1932. While at university, he joined the Communist Party of Germany (KPD)

Career
While in Frankfurt during May or June 1931, Weiss was  contacted by Hans Demetz who proposition Weiss, asked if he was interested travelling overseas for work; in effect he was recruited as an intelligence agent. Demetz was a Breaslau native and contemporary of Weiss at Breslau university, who had been recruited as a Red Army Intelligence agent in 1925.  After Weiss graduated he worked as an manager or buyer in a number of retail stores in Frankfurt and later Cologne.

Espionage
On 11 May 1932, Weiss moved to UK ostensibly to conduct industrial research at the London School of Economics  as a student, on the subject of the economics of air transport,  but in reality to spy.

In 1936, Weiss received intelligence detailing the production of aeroplanes from "Vernon" and "Merideth. Vernon was Wilfred Vernon who was a technical assistant at the Royal Aircraft Establishment in  Farnborough Airport.

References

Citations

Bibliography

 
 
 
 
 

1902 births
1982 deaths
Red Orchestra (espionage)
People from Wrocław
World War II spies for the Soviet Union
University of Breslau alumni